Trigonopterus foveatus is a species of flightless weevil in the genus Trigonopterus from Indonesia.

Etymology
The specific name is derived form the Latin word foveatus, meaning "pitted".

Description
Individuals measure 2.02–2.20 mm in length.  Body is slightly oval in shape.  General coloration black, with rust-colored legs and head.

Range

References

foveatus
Beetles described in 2014
Beetles of Asia
Insects of Indonesia